Log is a settlement in the Municipality of Rogatec in eastern Slovenia. It lies in the wooded hills above the right bank of the Sotla River, close to its source. Part of the surrounding area has been declared a forest reserve as a typical Subpannonian beech and oak forest preserved in its natural state. It is known as the Forest Reserve at Log on the Sotla River. The entire Rogatec are area traditionally belonged to the Styria region. It is now included in the Savinja Statistical Region.

References

External links
Log on Geopedia

Populated places in the Municipality of Rogatec